Girolamo Vivaldi (Genoa, 1495 – Genoa, 1577) was the 61st Doge of the Republic of Genoa.

Biography 
Born in Genoa around 1495, exponent of the Genoese noble family of the Vivaldi, he held various positions for the Genoese State among which procurator of the Republic, member of the college of Governors, mayor of the village of Sestri Levante and supreme syndicator.

He was elected doge on January 4, 1559: the sixteenth in biennial succession and the sixty-first in republican history. In his mandate he worked to take measures for public order, he graced some French prisoners detained in the port of Castiglione della Pescaia. and also the Republic of Genoa, under his dogate, rejoiced at the peace reached between Spain by Philip II and the France of Henry II, that, indirectly, also brought benefits to the Genoese state.

When the doge's mandate ended on January 4, 1561, Girolamo Vivaldi preferred not to participate in public life any longer due to obvious health problems. He died in Genoa in 1577 and was buried inside the sanctuary of the Madonna del Monte.

See also 

 Doge of Genoa
 Republic of Genoa

References 

1495 births
1577 deaths
16th-century Doges of Genoa